This table displays the top-rated primetime television series of the 1980–81 season as measured by Nielsen Media Research.

References

1980 in American television
1981 in American television
1980-related lists
1981-related lists
Lists of American television series